Dulce de Jesus Soares is an East Timorese politician, and a member of the National Congress for Timorese Reconstruction (CNRT). From June 2018 to May 2020, she was the Minister of Education, Youth and Sports, serving under the VIII Constitutional Government of East Timor; she had previously been the Vice Minister of Education I and the Vice Minister of Basic/Primary Education.

Career
In independent East Timor, Soares worked initially as a project manager for UNICEF.

From 8 August 2012 to 16 February 2015, Soares was Vice Minister of Basic/Primary Education under Prime Minister Xanana Gusmão in the V Constitutional Government of East Timor.

In the reshuffle brought about by the appointment of Rui Maria de Araújo as Prime Minister, Soares became Vice Minister of Education I. After Education Minister Fernando de Araújo died unexpectedly on 2 June 2015, Soares led the Ministry on an interim basis, until the new Education Minister António da Conceição was sworn in. Upon the commencement of the VII Constitutional Government on 15 September 2017 Soares' term in the Cabinet ended.

In 2018, the National Parliament of East Timor was dissolved early. In the elections that followed the dissolution, the Alliance for Change and Progress (AMP), which also included the CNRT, won an absolute majority. On 22 June 2018, Soares was sworn in as Minister of Education, Youth and Sports in the VIII Constitutional Government.

Following the breakdown of the AMP coalition in the first few months of 2020, the CNRT decided on 30 April 2020 that its members serving in the VIII Constitutional Government would resign their positions. The CNRT informed the government of its decision on 8 May 2020, and Soares resigned as Minister of Education, Youth and Sports on 25 May 2020.

References

External links 

Living people

Government ministers of East Timor
21st-century women politicians
Women government ministers of East Timor
National Congress for Timorese Reconstruction politicians
Year of birth missing (living people)